Nicholas Brewer Thoman (born March 6, 1986) is an American competition swimmer who specializes in the backstroke and is an Olympic gold medalist.  He has won two world championships as a member of winning United States medley relay teams at the FINA World Aquatics Championships.  From 2009 to 2015 he held the world record in the 100-meter backstroke (short course).  Thoman has won a total of ten medals in major international competition, four gold, three silver, and three bronze spanning the Olympics, World Championships, Pan Pacific Championships, Pan American Games, and the Summer Universiade.  He was a member of the 2012 U.S. Olympic team, and won gold and silver medals at the 2012 Summer Olympics.

On December 6, 2013, at the U.S. national championships in Knoxville Tennessee, Thoman set three American records in one evening.  He broke the American record in the 50-yard backstroke (20.69), was part of an American record-breaking 200-yard medley relay (with E. Knight, T. Phillips and C. Jones, 1:23.02) and shattered the American record in the 100-yard backstroke with a time of 44.07.

Career

Thoman was born in Cincinnati, Ohio.  He swam for Cincinnati Aquatic Club under head coach Benson Spurling from age 8 through high school. He attended Mariemont High School in the suburbs of Cincinnati and was coached by Kevin Maness.  At the 2009 Duel in the Pool, a short course meet, Thoman combined with Mark Gangloff, Michael Phelps, and Nathan Adrian in 4×100-meter medley relay to break the world record previously held by Canada.  While leading off the relay, Thoman also broke the world record in the 100-meter backstroke with a time of 48.94.

At the 2010 National Championships, Thoman qualified to swim at the 2010 Pan Pacific Swimming Championships in the 50, 100 and 200-meter backstroke.  In the 100-meter backstroke final at the 2010 National Championships, Thoman was out first at the first 50 with a time of 25.80.  However, he faded to third place with a time of 53.78, finishing behind David Plummer and Aaron Peirsol. In the 200-meter backstroke final, Thoman finished in 5th place with a time of 1:57.7. At the 2010 Pan Pacific Swimming Championships, Thoman won bronze in the 50-meter backstroke.

At the 2010 FINA Short Course World Championships in Dubai, Thoman won a gold medal in the 4×100-meter medley relay with Mihail Alexandrov, Ryan Lochte, and Garrett Weber-Gale. Thoman also competed in the 50 and 100-meter backstroke in Dubai but finished out of medal contention in both events.

At the 2011 World Aquatics Championships in Shanghai, China, Thoman placed fourth in the final of the 100-meter backstroke with a time of 53.01.  In the 4×100-meter medley relay with Mark Gangloff, Michael Phelps, and Nathan Adrian, Thoman won gold with a time of 3:32.06.  Swimming the backstroke leg, Thoman had a time of 53.61.

2012 Summer Olympics

At the 2012 U.S. Olympic Trials in Omaha, Nebraska, the U.S. qualifying meet for the Olympics, Thoman made the U.S. Olympic team for the first time by finishing second in the 100-meter backstroke in a time of 52.86.  Thoman also placed third in the 200-meter backstroke with a time of 1:57.06, missing a spot in that event.

At the 2012 Summer Olympics in London, Thoman won his inaugural Olympic medal, a silver, in the 100-meter backstroke. In the final, Thoman placed second behind fellow American Matt Grevers with a time of 52.92.  He also earned a gold medal swimming the backstroke leg for the winning U.S. team in the preliminaries of the 4×100-meter medley relay.

Personal bests
.

Key:  WR = World record

See also

 List of Olympic medalists in swimming (men)
 List of United States records in swimming
 List of University of Arizona people
 List of World Aquatics Championships medalists in swimming (men)
 List of world records in swimming
 World record progression 100 metres backstroke
 World record progression 4 × 100 metres medley relay

References

External links
 
 
 
 
 
 

1986 births
Living people
American male backstroke swimmers
Arizona Wildcats men's swimmers
Medalists at the FINA World Swimming Championships (25 m)
Medalists at the 2012 Summer Olympics
Olympic gold medalists for the United States in swimming
Olympic silver medalists for the United States in swimming
Swimmers from Cincinnati
Swimmers at the 2012 Summer Olympics
World Aquatics Championships medalists in swimming
World record setters in swimming
Swimmers at the 2015 Pan American Games
Pan American Games gold medalists for the United States
Pan American Games medalists in swimming
Universiade medalists in swimming
Universiade silver medalists for the United States
Universiade bronze medalists for the United States
Medalists at the 2007 Summer Universiade
Medalists at the 2015 Pan American Games
20th-century American people
21st-century American people